Chapman Coal Company Garage and Stable is a historic site in the District of Columbia. It is located at 57 N Street NW in Washington. It was listed on the National Register of Historic Places on October 23, 2013.

The site was redeveloped in 2016–2018 into a 114-unit mixed-use condominium complex named Chapman Stables. The developer, Four Points LLC, converted the original building into 36 condominiums, and built a new five-story adjacent building with an additional 78 units.

References

Buildings and structures in Washington, D.C.
Commercial buildings on the National Register of Historic Places in Washington, D.C.
Residential condominiums in Washington, D.C.